Unibind is a subsidiary of Peleman Industries, a company that was founded in 1939 in Belgium. The Unibind brand name is associated with thermal bookbinding machines and supplies.

Unibind machines 
Unibind thermal binding machines utilize "SteelBinding" technology, which uses resin in a steel channel to bind a document's pages together. Unibind machines provide permanent binding for hardcover, paperback, and photo books, and they can bind multiple documents at one time. The machines are available in several different sizes. Multiple desktop models are available for business and home offices. The largest one, the ST1025, can bind up to 50 books at once.

Unibind binding was recommended by PC Magazine.

Unibind covers 
Unibind manufactures covers that can be used with their machines. These include UniCover Flex, UniCover Hard, UniCover Spine, and UniCover Soft. The company also makes customized covers allowing users to brand their printed reports with original logos.

References 

Companies based in Antwerp Province
Bookbinding
Belgian brands